Wooten is a surname. Notable people with the surname include:
Andrew Wooten, German-American professional soccer player
Brian Wooten, American musician
Chandler Wooten (born 1999), American football player
Dudley G. Wooten, American politician
Gene Wooten, American musician
John Wooten, American football player
Kenny Wooten, American basketball player
Mike Wooten (football player), American football player
Mike Wooten (trooper), Alaska State trooper tied to the Sarah Palin Public Safety Commissioner dismissal
Ron Wooten, American football player
Roy Wilfred Wooten, better known as Future Man, American musician
Shawn Wooten, American baseball player
Tito Wooten, American football player
Victor Wooten, American musician

See also
Carl Wooten Field, stadium of Oklahoma Panhandle State University
Goodall Wooten House, historic home in Austin, Texas
 Wooten desk
 Wooton (disambiguation)
 Wootten